Danish Defence Research Establishment short FOFT was the consultative, guiding and promotion organ in the scientific and technical area for the Danish military. It was an independent institute under the Ministry of Defence. FOFT was located on Svanemøllens Barracks in Copenhagen.

Established in 1970 as a successor to Forsvarets Forskningsråd, it had a status of sector-research-institute, on the same line as example Arbejdsmiljøinstituttet, Statens Institut for Folkesundhed or Statens Serum Institut.

FOFT represented the Danish military in international research-fora, like NATO Research and Technology Organisation (RTO) or Western European Armaments Group (WEAG).

On 31 December 2006 the agency was disbanded and the responsibilities transferred to Defence Materiel Service.

External links
 Archived former website

Defence Research Establishment
Defence Research Establishment
Scientific organizations based in Denmark
1970 establishments in Denmark
2006 disestablishments in Denmark